Pilchuck may refer to:

Places

Mount Pilchuck
Mount Pilchuck State Park
Pilchuck River

Schools

Marysville Pilchuck High School
Pilchuck Glass School